The Sony Ericsson W900i is a 3G mobile phone manufactured by Sony Ericsson. The display of the device is a 240×320 pixel 262,000 color (an 18-bit color depth) 2.1-inch TFT QVGA screen. It has a swivel form factor, which makes the W900 larger than many other phones when folded open. 
In addition to the 470 MB of internal flash memory, it also supports the Memory Stick PRO Duo as external memory. It has class 10 (4+1 / 3+2 slots), 32–48 kbit/s GPRS.  
The W900 can achieve data transfer rates of 384 kbit/s due to its 3G technology. It also includes Bluetooth, a 2-megapixel digital camera with auto-focus and the ability to take QVGA video at 30 frame/s supplemented by a second VGA camera used for video calling and self-portraits and most advertised of all, its ability to play MP3 audio files in Walkman mode for up to 30 hours and its ability to play long length MPEG-4 videos. 
When using the W900i as a phone, the standby time is up to 379 hours and talktime of up to 8 hours and 40 minutes. It also has an internal NVIDIA GoForce 4800 graphics processor and was bundled with the HPM-80 headset.

The Sony Ericsson W900i was released in early 2005 as the highest end phone to supplement the already successful line of Sony Ericsson Walkman branded phones. The first to feature a graphics chip, it also had above average video and camera capabilities. The 2-megapixel digital camera featured autofocus and white balance akin to Sony's lineup of Cyber-shot cameras. Sony later branded the K800i with the Cyber-shot name to showcase its impressive camera. The phone was released to Vodafone exclusively for a large part of the year in its white colored variation. Pulled from the market despite its success, this phone is widely considered one of the best Sony Ericsson Walkman based phones to date, and potentially the hardest to find. The white color was popular across European markets and therefore somewhat easier to come by. Not many carriers carried the black version, available for the full retail price from Sony Ericsson's retail website, making it a bit harder to find.

It is the phone used by James Bond in the 2006 Casino Royale film, as well as K800.

Specifications 
Screen
240x320 pixel
262,144 color TF
Memory Stick Duo support
Memory Stick PRO Duo support up to 8 GB (demands)
Phone memory 470MB
 
Networks
GSM 900
GSM 1800
GSM 1900
UMTS

Available colours
White
Black

Sizes
109 × 24 × 49 mm
4.3 × 0.9 × 1.9 inches

Weight
148 g
5.2 oz

Camera
2 mega pixel digital camera with auto-focus.
LED Light/Flash.

Miscellaneous 
 W900i has a text clipboard. It is possible to cut and paste text and numbers between contacts and messages, for example.
 Light can be used while taking pictures, videos, and outside the camera mode.
 Videos are captured in the 3GP format.
 The W900 is the last Sony Ericsson phone using the swivel form factor.

References

External links 
 Specifications 
infoSync World review
 Mobile-review.com Review

W900i
Mobile phones introduced in 2005
Mobile phones with infrared transmitter